School District 108 may refer to:
 Pekin Public Schools District 108
 Willow Springs School District 108
 Lake Park Community High School District 108